Pseudolaguvia ribeiroi, the painted catfish, is a species of catfish from Nepal and India.

Etymology
The fish is named in honor of entomologist Sydney H. Ribeiro, of the Zoological Survey of India, who collected the type specimen.

References

Ng, H.H. and M. Kottelat, 2005. Caelatoglanis zonatus, a new genus and species of the Erethistidae (Teleostei: Siluriformes) from Myanmar, with comments on the nomenclature of Laguvia and Hara species. Ichthyol. Explor. Freshwat. 16(1):13-22. 

Catfish of Asia
Fish of India
Taxa named by Sunder Lal Hora
Fish described in 1921
Erethistidae